Rugger may mean:

A slang word for rugby, or for one who plays rugby football, or a rugby shirt
A person who makes rugs, or a tool used when making rugs
Rugger Ardizoia, an Italian baseball player
Rugger (Star Wars), a fictional creature in the Star Wars universe
Daihatsu Rugger, an off-road vehicle built by Daihatsu between 1984 and 2002

See also
Rug (disambiguation)
Rugging (disambiguation)